Sing to the Sky is the second album from Japanese singer, Ayaka.

Background 
Second album from Ayaka was confirmed on 26 April 2008. It is to include all of her singles from Jewelry Day up to the latest Okaeri. There are three versions, first press CD+DVD (music video collection), CD+DVD (live performance video collection), and CD-only version. Second bonus track "I Believe (English Version)" only comes with the CD+DVD versions. In one in a hundred first press discs, there's a "gold ticket" which can be traded in for a special DVD like Ayaka's first album. Fifteenth track "Konya mo Hoshi ni Dakarete" is the theme song of the 2008 film The Sky Crawlers.

Commercial performance
Sing to the Sky debuted at #3 on Oricon Daily Charts with index sales of more than 44,000 copies, however, the next day the album moved to #2 for 5 days and finally reached #1 on its seventh day. By the end of the week the album debuted at #2 on the weekly charts with sales of more than 315,000 copies, a little less than her debut album. Sing to the Sky was kept out of the top position by Greeeen's second album A, Domo. Ohisashiburi Desu., which sold more than 377,000 copies.

Sing to the Sky has been certified Triple Platinum by RIAJ for shipment of 750,000 copies .

Track listing

Charts
Oricon Sales Chart (Japan)

References

External links
Special album interview on Excite Music 

2008 albums
Ayaka albums
Warner Music Japan albums